In 2019 there were more than 1,200 churches from different Christian denominations in Moscow. The majority of the population belongs to the Russian Orthodox Church, which consequently has by far the largest number of churches; (1154 in 2017) compared to over 1600 before the 1917 revolution; much smaller numbers belong to various Eastern and Western denominations. Non-orthodox churches include the Seventh-day Adventist church, the Roman Catholic Cathedral of the Immaculate Conception of the Holy Virgin Mary and the Anglican St. Andrew's Church. There have been indications of other Christian denominations in Moscow since the 14th century, when the first non-orthodox parishes were created (such as Protestant Churches).

Until 1917, more than 1,600 churches existed in Moscow; however, this changed after the 1917 Revolution in Russia, when the Bolsheviks came to power. One of their ideologies was state atheism, and subsequently many churches were destroyed or reconstructed for other purposes. By the time the Soviet Union's last president, Mikhail Gorbachev, introduced his glasnost (openness) policy to eliminate persecution against religious groups and instead adopt freedom of religion. there were only about 150 open churches left in Moscow. Since then, religion in Russia and Moscow has experienced a revival, and many churches have or are being reconstructed or restored and then reconsecrated. Today, there are more than 900 religious organizations and more than 40 denominations in Moscow. The dominant denomination in both believers and churches is the Russian Orthodox Church, with 320 parishes.

On 29 July 2011, the Moscow Patriarchate and the acting mayor of Moscow, Vladimir Resin, agreed upon the project "Program 200". Their aim is to reconstruct 200 churches that were destroyed during the Soviet Era. The first church from that project, the Church-Chapel of the Blessed Saint Dmitry Donskoy, was consecrated on 13 June 2012 in the Northwestern Okrug. By December 21, 2017 statistics, Russian Orthodox Church had 1154 churches and chapels in Moscow, including: 6 Kremlin cathedrals, 2 cathedral churches, 295 parish churches, 31 baptismal churches, 114 temporary churches, 54 monastery churches. By 2018, there were 507 Russian Orthodox churches with no less than once a week sacred worship.

The list below is geographically subdivided into ten administrative okrugs: Centre, North, Northeast, East, Southeast, South, Southwest, West, Northwest and Zelenograd. Within each of these ten tables, the boldfaced entries are alphabetically sorted by the patron saint or the church's consecrated feast day. The column "Year of completion" lists date of the church's completion or the consecration of the respective active building, without consideration of any subsequent renovations, expansions or additional construction (e.g., former wooden churches on the same location). If the build year is unknown, an approximate date is listed. The column "District" indicates the Moscow district where the church is located. The precise geographic coordinate is included under the district; these coordinates link to a map of the city and the location of the selected church.

The list is restricted to isolated consecrated churches and cathedrals. Desecrated, former churches are not listed here, nor are churches which do not occupy their own building or a part of it (e.g., house churches within secular buildings). Chapels and other sacred buildings without regular church services are not listed (including pure baptisteries and memorial chapels).

List of churches by districts

Centre

North

Northeast

East

Southeast

South

Southwest

West

Northwest

Zelenograd

See also
 Cathedral of the Immaculate Conception (Moscow)

Notes

References

General
  Database of the Moscow Churches 
 List of Churches in Moscow at openmoscow.ru 
 Orthodox Churches of the Moscow Eparchy 
Orthodox Churches in Moscow (in English)

Specific

Further reading 

 
 
 

 
Moscow
Tourist attractions in Moscow
Moscow
Churches